The 1994–95 Czech Extraliga season was the second season of the Czech Extraliga since its creation after the breakup of Czechoslovakia and the Czechoslovak First Ice Hockey League in 1993.

Standings

Playoffs

Quarterfinal
HC Dadák Vsetín - HC Chemopetrol Litvínov 3:0 (1:0,2:0,0:0)
HC Dadák Vsetín - HC Chemopetrol Litvínov 4:2 (0:1,0:1,4:0)
HC Chemopetrol Litvínov - HC Dadák Vsetín 6:3 (1:0,3:1,2:2)
HC Chemopetrol Litvínov - HC Dadák Vsetín 1:5 (0:3,0:0,1:2)
HC Kladno - HC Slavia Praha 7:4 (1:0,0:1,6:3)
HC Kladno - HC Slavia Praha 4:2 (2:1,1:0,1:1)
HC Slavia Praha - HC Kladno 2:3 (1:2,0:1,1:0)
HC Olomouc - HC České Budějovice 2:5 (2:3,0:1,0:1)
HC Olomouc - HC České Budějovice 2:10 (0:6,2:2,0:2)
HC České Budějovice - HC Olomouc 5:3 (2:0,1:0,2:3)
AC ZPS Zlín - HC Interconex Plzeň 2:1 PP (1:0,0:1,0:0,1:0)
AC ZPS Zlín - HC Interconex Plzeň 3:1 (1:0,1:1,1:0)
HC Interconex Plzeň - AC ZPS Zlín 3:4 (1:2,0:1,2:1)

Semifinal
HC Dadák Vsetín - HC České Budějovice 3:1 (1:0,1:1,1:0)
HC Dadák Vsetín - HC České Budějovice 3:2 PP (0:1,0:0,2:1,1:0)
HC České Budějovice - HC Dadák Vsetín 2:4 (0:0,1:1,1:3)
HC Kladno - AC ZPS Zlín 3:7 (1:1,1:2,1:4)
HC Kladno - AC ZPS Zlín 3:2 (0:0,0:0,3:2)
AC ZPS Zlín - HC Kladno 8:3 (3:1,3:0,2:2)
AC ZPS Zlín - HC Kladno 3:4 SN (0:1,2:2,1:0,0:0)
HC Kladno - AC ZPS Zlín 1:5 (1:2,0:1,0:2)

3rd place
HC České Budějovice - HC Kladno 5:3 (4:1,0:0,1:2)
HC Kladno - HC České Budějovice 5:4 PP (3:2,1:1,0:1,1:0)
HC Kladno - HC České Budějovice 3:4 PP (1:2,2:1,0:0,0:1)

Final
HC Vsetin - AC ZPS Zlin 3-6, 2-1, 4-2, 2-1

HC Vsetin is 1994-95 Czech champion.

Relegation

References

External links 
 

Czech Extraliga seasons
1994–95 in Czech ice hockey
Czech